Glory Days is an American drama television series that aired from July 25 until September 13, 1990.

Premise
Four people who were friends in high school later start going different ways.

Cast
Spike Alexander as Dave Rutecki
Brad Pitt as Walker Lovejoy
Evan Mirand as Dominic Fopiano
Nicholas Kallsen as Peter "T-Bone" Trigg
Beth Broderick as Sheila Jackson
Robert Costanzo as V.T. Krantz

Episodes

References

External links

1990 American television series debuts
1990 American television series endings
1990s American drama television series
English-language television shows
Fox Broadcasting Company original programming
Television shows filmed in Vancouver
Television series by MGM Television